The next Scottish Parliament election is due to be held on Thursday 7 May 2026 to elect 129 members to the Scottish Parliament. It will be the seventh general election since the devolved parliament was established in 1999.

Five parties have MSPs in the sixth parliament: Scottish National Party (SNP) led by First Minister Nicola Sturgeon, the Scottish Conservatives led by Douglas Ross, Scottish Labour led by Anas Sarwar, the Scottish Greens, led by their co-leaders Patrick Harvie and Lorna Slater, and the Scottish Liberal Democrats, led by Alex Cole-Hamilton. Of these parties, two have changed their leaders since the last Scottish Parliament election in 2021.

Date
Under the Scottish Elections (Reform) Act 2020, an ordinary general election to the Scottish Parliament would normally be held on the first Thursday in May five years after the 2021 election, i.e. in May 2026. This Act superseded the  Scotland Act 1998, which had set elections in every fourth year.

The date of the poll may be varied by up to one month either way by the monarch, on the proposal of the Presiding Officer.

If Parliament itself resolves that it should be dissolved, with at least two-thirds of the Members (i.e. 86 Members) voting in favour, the Presiding Officer proposes a date for an extraordinary general election and the Parliament is dissolved by the monarch by royal proclamation.

It does not necessarily require a two-thirds majority to precipitate an extraordinary general election, because under the Scotland Act Parliament is also dissolved if it fails to nominate one of its members to be First Minister within certain time limits, irrespective of whether at the beginning or in the middle of a parliamentary term. Therefore, if the First Minister resigned, Parliament would then have 28 days to elect a successor (s46(2)b and s46(3)a). If no new First Minister was elected then the Presiding Officer would ask for Parliament to be dissolved under s3(1)a. This process could also be triggered if the First Minister lost a vote of confidence by a simple majority (i.e. more than 50%), as s/he must then resign (Scotland Act 1998 s45(2)).

No extraordinary general elections have been held to date. Any extraordinary general elections would be in addition to ordinary general elections, unless held less than six months before the due date of an ordinary general election, in which case they supplant it. The subsequent ordinary general election reverts to the first Thursday in May, five years after the previous ordinary election.

Scottish National Party MP Angus MacNeil has called for an early election, and to use it as a de facto second Scottish independence referendum.

Election system, seats, and regions

The total number of Members of the Scottish Parliament (MSPs) elected to the Parliament is 129.

The First Periodical Review of the Scottish Parliament's constituencies and regions by the Boundary Commission for Scotland, was announced on 3 July 2007. The Commission published its provisional proposals for the regional boundaries in 2009.

The Scottish Parliament uses an additional member system (AMS), designed to produce approximate proportional representation for each region. There are 8 regions, each sub-divided into smaller constituencies. There are a total of 73 constituencies. Each constituency elects one MSP by the plurality (first past the post) system of election. Each region elects 7 additional MSPs using an additional member system. 
A modified D'Hondt method, using the constituency results, is used to elect these additional MSPs.

The Scottish Parliament constituencies have not been coterminous with Scottish Westminster constituencies since the 2005 general election, when the 72 former UK Parliament constituencies were replaced with a new set of 59, generally larger, constituencies (see Scottish Parliament (Constituencies) Act 2004). The boundaries used for the Scottish Parliament elections were then revised for the 2011 election. The Boundary Commission also recommended changes to the electoral regions used to elect "list" members of the Scottish Parliament, which were also implemented in 2011.

Target constituency seats
Below are listed all the constituencies which require a swing of less than 5% from the 2021 results to change hands. The Scottish Greens do not have any constituencies where they require a swing of less than 5% (having gained their current seats from the regional list vote). The 7.55% swing the Scottish Greens need to gain Glasgow Kelvin is their nearest opportunity in terms of a constituency seat, in which the party finished second in the last Scottish Parliament election behind the SNP.

SNP targets

Conservative targets

Labour targets

Liberal Democrat targets

Opinion polling

Key
 SNP – Scottish National Party
 Conservative – Scottish Conservatives
 Labour – Scottish Labour
 Lib Dem – Scottish Liberal Democrats
 Green – Scottish Greens
 Alba – Alba Party

See also
 Next United Kingdom general election
 Next Senedd election
 Next Northern Ireland Assembly election

References

Future elections in the United Kingdom
General elections to the Scottish Parliament